is a Japanese artistic gymnast. Born in Saitama, Japan, he graduated from Juntendo University and later join Central Sports. Takeda was part of Japan men's national gymnastics team that won the gold medal at 2015 World Championships.

See also 
 Japan men's national gymnastics team
 World Artistic Gymnastics Championships – Men's team all-around

References

External links 
 Naoto Hayasaka at FIG website

Japanese male artistic gymnasts
Sportspeople from Saitama Prefecture
Living people
1995 births
20th-century Japanese people
21st-century Japanese people